Heribert of Cologne ( 970 – 16 March 1021), also known as Saint Heribert, was a German Roman Catholic prelate who served as the Archbishop of Cologne from 999 until his death. He also served as the Chancellor for the Emperor Otto III since 994. He also collaborated with Henry II, Holy Roman Emperor with whom relations were strained though were strengthened over time.

Heribert's canonization was confirmed around 1075.

Life

Heribert was born around 970 in Worms to Count Hugo and Tietwista. On the maternal side his half-brother was Heinrich who was the Bishop of Würzburg.

He was educated in the school at the Worms Cathedral and at the Benedictine Gorze convent in Lorraine. Heribert studied alongside Bruno of Carinthia who was the future Pope Gregory V. He wanted to become a Benedictine monk but his father disapproved of that path and Heribert no longer pursued it. He returned to the Worms Cathedral to serve as its provost and received his ordination to the priesthood in 994 from Bishop Holdebold. The Bishop of Worms wanted Heribert to be his successor though the emperor took notice of him and planned to bring him as an advisor to his court.

The Emperor Otto III appointed him in 994 as the Italian chancellor and in 998 for the German kingdom. He held the latter position until Otto III's death. He had accompanied the emperor to Rome in 996 and again in 997 and was still on the peninsula when word came that he had been chosen as the Archbishop of Cologne. In Benevento he received investiture and the pallium from the new Pope Sylvester II on 9 July 999 and on the following Christmas received his episcopal consecration at Cologne in the archdiocesan cathedral.

In 1002 he was present at the deathbed of Otto III at Paterno. While returning to his homeland to Aachen with the Emperor's remains and the imperial insignia he was captured at the behest of the future Saint Heinrich II whom he had first opposed but later served. Once the latter was made king in 1002 he acknowledged him as such and served as his collaborator and still as chancellor. The pair's relations were not the best though the new emperor came to respect his abilities and the rift between them turned into a friendship. In 1003 he founded the Deutz convent on the Rhine. Heribert often sent alms to the poor and sent alms to priests to distribute to the poor.

Heribert died on 16 March 1021 in his archdiocese and was buried at his convent church after their transferral on 30 August 1147. Heribert contracted a fever while on a pastoral visitation and hurried back to Cologne to recover where he died within the week.

Canonization
Heribert was honoured as a saint during his lifetime and was canonized in about 1075. His reported miracles included ending a drought; he is thus invoked for beneficial rains.

His relics were kept in the convent church at Deutz in a golden casket which is now preserved in the parish church of "Neu-St.Heribert" in Köln-Deutz.

References

External links
 Catholic Online
 Catholic Hierarchy
 Santi e Beati

970s births
1021 deaths

Year of birth uncertain
11th-century Roman Catholic archbishops in the Holy Roman Empire
11th-century Christian saints
Archbishops of Cologne
German Roman Catholic saints
Medieval German saints
People from Worms, Germany